Boursin is a commune in the Pas-de-Calais department in the Hauts-de-France region in northern France.

Geography
A small farming village located 12 miles (19 km) south of Calais, on the D251 road.

Population

Sights
 The church of St. Lambert, dating from the nineteenth century.

See also
Communes of the Pas-de-Calais department

References

External links

 Boursin on the Quid website 

Communes of Pas-de-Calais